The Beijing–Kunming Expressway, designated as G5 and commonly referred to as the Jingkun Expressway is an expressway that connects the cities of Beijing, and Kunming, in Yunnan province. As of 2018, the expressway has been completed in its entirety.

Route
The Beijing–Kunming Expressway runs from Beijing, the capital of the People's Republic of China, to Kunming, in the Yunnan Province. It passes through the following major cities:

 Beijing
 Shijiazhuang, Hebei
 Taiyuan, Shanxi
 Xi'an, Shaanxi
 Chengdu, Sichuan
 Kunming, Yunnan

Detailed itinerary

References

05
Expressways in Hebei
Expressways in Shanxi
Expressways in Shaanxi
Expressways in Sichuan
Expressways in Beijing
Expressways in Yunnan